The Cessna 160 was an American single-engine, four-seater, high wing, strut-braced, prototype monoplane designed in 1962 by Cessna.

Development beyond the prototype stage was not pursued and only one example was constructed.

Development
Cessna thought that a less expensive four-seater aircraft than the existing Cessna 172 would have good market potential. The company designed a simplified four-seat high-wing aircraft using non-tapering wings, extensive use of heavily beaded wing and fuselage skins as well as free-castering nose gear to save weight and decrease the man-hours required for construction.

The aircraft was intended to be sold for US$8,450, which would have been just US$955 more than the 1962 model two-place Cessna 150B and far below the cost of the 1962 model Cessna 172C, which was US$9895.

The intention was to use a  Continental O-300 engine for the production model.

The aircraft was subjected to a flight test program in 1962 and 1963.

The flight test program showed that, while the aircraft met its goals, it did not offer enough cost advantages to proceed to production when tooling costs were accounted for. As a result, the project was abandoned.

The sole prototype Cessna 160 was retained by the company until 1974, when it was sold as scrap. The scrap yard did not complete the destruction of the airframe and it was later offered for sale.

See also

 Cessna 150
 Cessna 172

References

External links
 Photo of the completed Cessna 160 prototype and two photos of the abandoned fuselage in a scrapyard

Abandoned civil aircraft projects of the United States
160
High-wing aircraft
Single-engined tractor aircraft
1960s United States civil aircraft
Aircraft first flown in 1962